Scévole de Sainte-Marthe (20 December 1571, Loudun – 7 September 1650) was a French historian.

He studied at the University of Poitiers.

Publications 
 Histoire généalogique de la Maison de France
 Histoire généalogique de la maison de La Trémoïlle

External links
 

1571 births
1650 deaths
People from Loudun
17th-century French historians
17th-century French male writers
Writers from Nouvelle-Aquitaine
French male non-fiction writers
University of Poitiers alumni